Geoffrey Claremont Parsons (born 7 January 1910, died 22 December 1987, Eastbourne) was an English lyricist.

He worked at the Peter Maurice Music Company run by James Phillips, who wrote under the pen name John Turner. The company specialized in adapting songs originally in foreign languages into the English language. Phillips would usually assign a song to Parsons and when the latter was finished, suggest some changes. The credits for the English lyrics would then be given as "John Turner and Geoffrey Parsons."

Songs
"Auf Wiederseh'n Sweetheart" (with Turner)
"Eternally", with John Turner; music by Charles Chaplin (Theme from Limelight)
"If You Love Me (Really Love Me)" ("Hymne à l'amour," original lyrics by Édith Piaf)
"The Little Shoemaker" based on the French song "Le petit cordonnier", with Turner and Nathan Korb.
"Mama" (with Turner)
"Oh! My Pa-Pa" based on the German song "O Mein Papa" by Paul Burkhard, under the pseudonym "John Sexton" (with Turner)
"La Seine"
"Smile" (with Turner)

References

External links

English songwriters
English lyricists
1910 births
1987 deaths
20th-century English musicians